Vicky Holland (born 12 January 1986) is a British triathlete who is part of the Great Britain and Northern Ireland Olympic team, a 2-time World Mixed Team Champion and the 2018 ITU WTS champion. She was born in Gloucester. She is the first female triathlete to win an Olympic medal for Great Britain, a bronze in 2016. In 2021, she competed in the women's event at the 2020 Summer Olympics in Tokyo, Japan.

Holland also competes in Super League Triathlon.

Career
She is coached by Darren Smith.

While at school Holland was a nationally ranked swimmer before moving to athletics and taking up the 1,500 metres.  She didn't begin competing in triathlon until her second year at Loughborough University when she was approached by British Triathlon.

In the 2010 ITU Triathlon World Cup series Holland placed eighth overall, qualifying her for National Lottery funding as part of the World Class Performance scheme.

At the 2011 ITU Triathlon World Cup event in Hyde Park, London, Hayes finished in 17th position in an event won  by compatriot Helen Jenkins over the course for the 2012 Summer Olympics.

In the San Diego leg of the ITU Triathlon World Cup, in May 2012, Holland placed fifth in an event that was won by Jenkins, with fellow British competitor Liz Blatchford finishing 16th. Later the same month at the Madrid event Holland finished seventh, again beating Blatchford who placed tenth.

Holland was selected ahead of Blatchford to represent Great Britain at the 2012 Summer Olympics in the women's triathlon alongside Helen Jenkins and Lucy Hall. The event took place in Hyde Park with the swim being held in the Serpentine. The cycle  involved athletes leaving the park via Queen Mother's Gate, travelling through Wellington Arch, down Constitution Hill and on to Birdcage Walk in front of Buckingham Palace before returning to the park to complete the event with a four-lap run around the Serpentine. Holland completed the course in two hours, two minutes, and 55 seconds, 26th in the field.

In 2012 and 2014, Holland became World Champion as part of the British Mixed Team Relay squad, and on 24 July 2014, Vicki secured her first major individual medal, with Bronze at the Commonwealth Games.

Holland took gold in the mixed triathlon team relay at the 2014 Commonwealth Games, with the Brownlee brothers, Alistair and Jonathan, and Jodie Stimpson.

In April 2015 Holland took her first victory in the World Triathlon Series when she won the Cape Town round of the 2015 Series. She followed this up with a second World Series victory in Edmonton and third place in the Grand Final in Chicago which gave her fourth position overall for the year and qualification for the British Olympic team in Rio 2016.

In 2021 Holland completed an all British podium, at Super League Triathlon, London, alongside Jess Learmonth and Georgia Taylor-Brown.

References

External links

1986 births
Living people
English female triathletes
Sportspeople from Gloucester
Triathletes at the 2012 Summer Olympics
Triathletes at the 2016 Summer Olympics
Triathletes at the 2020 Summer Olympics
Olympic bronze medallists for Great Britain
Medalists at the 2016 Summer Olympics
Olympic triathletes of Great Britain
Alumni of Loughborough University
Commonwealth Games medallists in triathlon
Commonwealth Games bronze medallists for England
Triathletes at the 2014 Commonwealth Games
Triathletes at the 2018 Commonwealth Games
Team Bath athletes
Medallists at the 2014 Commonwealth Games
Medallists at the 2018 Commonwealth Games